Intermediate Capital Group is a private equity investment firm focused on providing capital to help companies grow through private and public markets and provides a number of strategies and funds aimed at institutional investors. It is headquartered in London, England, with offices in a further 13 countries, and is a constituent of the FTSE 250 Index.

History
The business was founded by six investment professionals in 1989 and was first listed on the London Stock Exchange in 1994. In 2010 it was reported that the credit crunch was driving its growth. Intermediate Capital listed a new bond on the London Stock Exchange's Order book for Retail Bonds (ORB) in 2011.

ICG has diversified its business away from its origins in private debt and equity, buying the real estate business Longbow in 2014 and acquiring the Graphite Enterprise Trust, which is now known as the ICG Enterprise Trust, in 2015. It hired an infrastructure investment team in 2018 and, in 2019, announced plans to build a private equity business in North America. The $42.6 billion firm has a “strong ambition” to expand in the continent.

ICG has been a beneficiary of the trend for institutional investors to allocate assets to alternative investments, raising over €10bn during the year ended 31 March 2019.

In November 2022, it was announced IGC had acquired the Madrid-headquartered renewable energy platform, Dos Grados on behalf of its €1.5 billion ($1.56 billion) debut Infrastructure Fund (ICG Infra).

References

External links

 ICG official website

Financial services companies based in the City of London
Financial services companies established in 1989
Private equity firms of the United Kingdom
Mezzanine capital investment firms
Companies listed on the London Stock Exchange